Väinö Elias Pastell (14 May 1881 - 8 September 1949) was a Finnish farmer and politician. He was born in  Sääminki, and was a member of the Parliament of Finland from 1927 to 1929, representing the National Coalition Party.

References

1881 births
1949 deaths
People from Savonlinna
People from Mikkeli Province (Grand Duchy of Finland)
National Coalition Party politicians
Members of the Parliament of Finland (1927–29)